Throwback, Vol. 1 is the seventh studio album by American R&B group Boyz II Men, released by Koch Records, and featuring covers of classic R&B songs (hence the album title) from such artists as Teddy Pendergrass, The Isley Brothers and Michael Jackson. The album was their first as a trio, after founding member Michael McCary left the group due to chronic back problems.

A rendition of Grandfather's Clock was included on the Taiwanese release as a bonus track.

Track listing
 "Let It Whip" (Dazz Band)
 "Let's Stay Together" (Al Green)
 "What You Won't Do for Love" (Bobby Caldwell, featuring MC Lyte)
 "Cutie Pie" (One Way)
 "Close the Door" (Teddy Pendergrass)
 "For the Love of You" (The Isley Brothers)
 "Sara Smile" (Hall & Oates)
 "Human Nature" (Michael Jackson, featuring Claudette Ortiz)
 "Time Will Reveal" (DeBarge)
 "I Miss You" (Klymaxx)
 "You Make Me Feel Brand New" (The Stylistics)
 "Grandfather's Clock" (bonus track)

It has been confirmed by one of the group members that a second CD will not be a part of The Throwback project. A Classic's CD was planned to be released later, potentially sometime in late 2007; this was later confirmed to be the Motown: A Journey Through Hitsville USA album, released in 2007.

Charts

References

2004 albums
Boyz II Men albums
Covers albums